National Florida Airlines was a commuter airline based in Daytona, Florida. National Florida flew several cities in central and south Florida. NFA declared Chapter 7 Bankruptcy on December 2, 1983.

History 
National Florida Airlines was founded in 1981, and started operations in December of that year. NFA started flying to Miami, Orlando, Tampa, out of Daytona Beach. In 1982, NFA added service to Fort Walton Beach and Fort Lauderdale.

Destinations 
In 1983, NFA flew to six cities in Florida
 Daytona Beach, FL (Hub)
 Miami, FL
 Orlando, FL
 Tampa, FL
 Fort Lauderdale, FL
 Ft. Walton Beach/Elgin A.F.B.

Fleet 
National Florida's fleet in 1983
 de Havilland Canada DHC-6 Twin Otter (N1345U, N778CC, N779CC, N794CC)
 Fairchild Swearingen Metroliner (N602AS)
 Piper PA-31 Navajo

See also 
 List of defunct airlines of the United States

References

Defunct airlines of the United States
Companies that have filed for Chapter 7 bankruptcy